Edinburgh North and Leith is a constituency of the House of Commons of the Parliament of the United Kingdom (at Westminster), first used in the 1997 general election. It elects one Member of Parliament (MP) by the first past the post system of election.

In 1999, a Scottish Parliament constituency was created with the same name and boundaries. See Edinburgh North and Leith (Scottish Parliament constituency). The boundaries of the Westminster constituency were altered, however, in 2005, and the Scottish Parliament constituency retained the older boundaries until 2011. Since then, the seat has mainly been split between the Edinburgh Northern and Leith and Edinburgh Central constituencies at Holyrood, with a small area also located in Edinburgh Western.

In the 2014 Scottish independence referendum, the constituency returned an above average No vote; 60% opted for Scotland to stay in the United Kingdom, while 40% preferred Scotland to become an independent country.
In the 2016 referendum to leave the European Union, the constituency voted remain by 78.2%. This was the seventh highest support for remain for a constituency.

Constituency profile
The constituency is urbanised, affluent and left-leaning, and covers several northern communities of the city, as well as most of the former burgh of Leith, which controversially amalgamated with the City of Edinburgh in 1920. It has the highest proportion of residents living in tenements and flats of any parliamentary constituency in the United Kingdom, and a relatively high proportion of university graduates. It includes a mix of leafy, expensive residential areas in the South and West of the constituency and densely populated areas nearer to Leith with more young professionals and students, as well as older residents whose families have lived there during several previous generations.

It also includes Calton Hill, the shops and offices on the northern side of Princes Street, Bute House, the official residence of the First Minister of Scotland, St Mary's Episcopal Cathedral, the Edinburgh Playhouse, the Edinburgh Waterfront, the stretch of the Water of Leith from Dean Village to Leith Harbour, the Royal Botanical Gardens, the Western General Hospital and the notable private schools.

Boundaries 

When created in 1997, Edinburgh North and Leith was largely a replacement for the Edinburgh Leith constituency, and was one of six constituencies covering the City of Edinburgh council area. One of those six, Edinburgh East and Musselburgh straddled the boundary with the East Lothian council area to take in Musselburgh. In terms of wards used in elections to the City of Edinburgh Council between 1995 and 2007, the constituency included the wards of Broughton, Calton, Granton, Harbour, Lorne, New Town, Newhaven, Pilton, Stockbridge and Trinity.

Constituency boundaries in Scotland were revised for the 2005 election. The number of constituencies within the city was reduced from six to five, each now entirely within the city area, and Musselburgh was reunited with the remainder of East Lothian. A new Edinburgh North and Leith constituency was created, including the whole of the former one, but also taking in the Dean ward from Edinburgh Central and Craigleith ward from Edinburgh West.

As a result of the Local Governance (Scotland) Act 2004, these wards were replaced with new, larger wards for the Council elections on 3 May 2007. The constituency now includes parts of the new wards of Leith, Leith Walk, Forth, Inverleith and City Centre, but none of these exclusively.

Members of Parliament

Election results

Elections in the 2010s

Elections in the 2000s

Elections in the 1990s

See also 
 Politics of Edinburgh

References

Westminster Parliamentary constituencies in Scotland
North and Leith
Constituencies of the Parliament of the United Kingdom established in 1997
Leith